Brockia is a genus of  thermophilic bacteria from the family of Thermoanaerobacteraceae, with one known species (Brockia lithotrophica), an obligate anaerobe, spore-forming, rod-shaped microorganism.

References

Further reading 
 

 

Bacteria genera
Monotypic bacteria genera
Bacillota
Thermoanaerobacterales
Thermophiles
Anaerobes